Pida patrana is a moth of the family Erebidae first described by Frederic Moore in 1859. It is found in north-eastern Bhutan, India (Bengal), Nepal and Taiwan.

References

Moths described in 1859
Lymantriinae